The National Journalism Center (NJC) is an American political organization established in 1977 by conservative journalist M. Stanton Evans. It runs programs and internships for journalism students to educate them on professional journalism, and conservative political issues and values. It is affiliated with Young America's Foundation, and the current director is Emily Jashinsky, culture editor at The Federalist.

Internships 
In dozens of 12-week sessions, the program provides journalism training and on-the-job experience in the city of Washington, D.C., in the United States.  NJC works with their interns in developing unbiased reporting skills on various topics, focusing mainly on politics and public policy.  NJC has placed interns at more than 50 outside outlets, including The Federalist, ABC, BBC, Black Entertainment Television, CNN, Larry King Live, National Journal, Newsweek, Roll Call, The Daily Caller, The Hill, The New Republic, United Press International, The Washingtonian, The Washington Free Beacon and other media outlets. 

Various speakers, including noted NJC alumni, work with interns as they learn political reporting in Washington, D.C. every summer, fall, and spring. Intern groups are small and focus on networking and socialization.  The 12-week sessions include tours of The White House, Library of Congress and panel discussions based on objective, conservative views.  Though the program does not accept or deny placement in regard to political preference, intern placements are often in well-known conservative publications.

Internships are selective, drawing from across the United States and Canada.  Each intern is given a monthly stipend to cover living and transportation costs in the District.

Discussion groups 
Placements are punctuated with weekly discussion groups held at the National Press Club, where the NJC offices are located.  Guest speakers include noted journalists, alumni, and lobbyists that share the NJC's political stance.  Question and answer allotments allow the interns to gain insight to the workings of practicing journalists.

Discussion groups are moderated by an academic director after breakfast, where topics such as education reform, euthanasia, the American prison system, abortion, and election policy are discussed.

Notable alumni 
Alumni of the journalism include:
Ann Coulter, conservative author, commentator and columnist 
Michael Fumento, conservative author and attorney
John Fund, columnist, National Review Online and senior editor, The American Spectator
Maggie Gallagher, conservative author, commentator and columnist
Malcolm Gladwell, author and staff writer, The New Yorker
Daniel T. Griswold, co-director of the Program on the American Economy and Globalization, Mercatus Center 
Greg Gutfeld, Fox News television host and author
Steven F. Hayward, author and professor, Pepperdine University
Michael Johns, national Tea Party movement co-founder, conservative commentator and former White House speechwriter
Cliff Kincaid, director of the Center for Investigative Journalism, Accuracy in Media
Rachel Marsden, conservative columnist and commentator
Jason Mattera, conservative activist and writer
William McGurn, columnist, The Wall Street Journal and former White House speechwriter
Richard Miniter, founder, American Media Institute, author and journalist
Brian Patrick Mitchell, writer and political theorist
Terry Moran, former co-anchor, Nightline and journalist
Doug Phillips, Christian author and attorney
Debbie Schlussel, conservative author and commentator 
Tim Carney, author and columnist, the Washington Examiner

Several NJC alumni have gone on to author books and become leading personalities on cable news shows

References

External links

Political organizations based in the United States
American journalism organizations
Internship programs
Youth organizations based in Washington, D.C.